Cambrian Heights is a suburban residential neighbourhood in the northwest quadrant of Calgary, Alberta. It is located immediately southeast from Nose Hill Park, east of 14th Street NW and south of John Laurie Boulevard.

Demographics

Residents in this community had a median household income of $59,522 in 2000, and there were 14.3% low income residents living in the neighbourhood. As of 2000, 12.8% of the residents were immigrants. A proportion of 10.6% of the buildings were condominiums or apartments, and 33.5% of the housing was used for renting.

See also
List of neighbourhoods in Calgary

References

External links

Neighbourhoods in Calgary